The 1983 Pau Grand Prix was a Formula Two motor race held on 22 May 1983 at the Pau circuit, in Pau, Pyrénées-Atlantiques, France. After initially winning the Grand Prix, Alain Ferté, as well as his teammate, Stefan Bellof were disqualified after their cars were found to be underweight. This therefore handed the win to Jo Gartner. Kenny Acheson finished second and Jonathan Palmer third.

Classification

Race

References

Pau Grand Prix
1983 in French motorsport